Dar-ul-Shifa is one part of the Old City of Hyderabad, India, named after the 16th-century hospital it once housed. The location was founded in AD 1591, more than 400 years ago, by Mohammed Quli Qutub Shah, the founder of Hyderabad city. Todday it houses a large population of Shia Muslims and comes alive on the days of Muharram and 
Shia festivals. Most of the households have family members settled abroad, and whose remittances increase the quality of life.

In Arabic, and derived from it in Urdu, Turkish and Persian, dar al-shifa means "house of health", i.e. "hospital". The name of the location is derived from the fact that initially the area was popularly known for its hospital. Dar-ul-Shifa Hospital and Jama Masjid were built in the same period as the Charminar monument-cum-mosque and the huge Makkah Masjid (Mecca Mosque).

Geographically, Dar-ul-Shifa lies in the south of Hyderabad city, on the banks of River Musi. It lies under the Charminar Assembly Constituency. Historically it is one of the old urban areas of Hyderabad; now it is part of the Old City of Hyderabad.

History
The area got this name for the hospital built by Sultan Mohammed Quli Qutub Shah over 400 years ago. Later, during the rule of the Nizams, due to insufficient space the hospital was moved to another building and the old building was converted into a Hussainia called Alawa e-Sartouq. The alam is made of part of the sartouq, a metal headgear with spikes, which the fourth Shia Imam Ali ibn Husayn Zayn al-Abidin had to put on after being captured by Yazid I's forces along with the ladies of Ahl al-Bayt. This Hussainia can be visited anytime throughout the year. Currently this building is under H.E.H. the Nizam's Charitable Trust.

Boundaries of Dar-ul-Shifa
Dar-ul-Shifa is surrounded by Musi River, Noorkhan Bazar, Dabeerpura, Purani Haveli and Chatta Bazaar.

Darushifa starts from the new Bridge Mosque, also known as Naya Pul, and the suburbs start from the Masjid Haji Kamal and on the other side Aza Khane Zehra, which was built by HEH, the 7th Nizam-Mir Osman Ali Khan.

Development and landmarks
Darushifa is one of the oldest urban area of Hyderabad city and was developed in the Nizam's period with the extension of Jama Masjid. One can find the beautifully renewed Jama Masjid, with a market around the area of the mosque. Here you can find your choice of shops and restaurants, the most famous restaurant being  Hussaini Cafe.

There are two famous orphanages namely Dar-ul-Yatama and Zehra boys, which dal under (??) for Shia community charitable hostels.

Until the 1980s, the Hyderabad Municipal Corporation head office was located in Dar-ul-Shifa, currently it is serving as Quli Qutub Shahi Urban Development Authority (QQSUDA) head office.

Transport
Dar-u-Shifa is connected by buses run by TSRTC. All the RTC buses which head towards Charminar rout thru Dar-ul-Shifa.

The closest MMTS train station is at Dabeerpura.

Fire incident at QQSUDA 

On May 7, 2019 , a fire broke out at the Quli Qutub Shahi Urban Development Authority in Darulshifa. The fire, which broke out at around 4 pm on Monday, started at the record room that is on the first floor of the GHMC-owned building.The fire officials found it difficult to control the fire due to poor condition of the building .After nearly four hours , the fire was contained .

References

Neighbourhoods in Hyderabad, India
Heritage structures in Hyderabad, India
Hospitals in Telangana
Hospitals in Hyderabad, India